Richard Wingfield, 1st Viscount Powerscourt PC (I) (19 August 1697 – 21 October 1751) was an Anglo-Irish politician and peer.

Early life
Powerscourt was the son of Edward Wingfield, MP for Sligo County, and his wife, Eleanor Gore, a daughter of Sir Arthur Gore, 1st Baronet. He was a descendant of the uncle of Folliott Wingfield, 1st Viscount Powerscourt.

Career
He sat in the Irish House of Commons as the Member of Parliament for Boyle between 1727 and 1743. On 4 February 1743 he was elevated to the Peerage of Ireland as Viscount Powerscourt, of Powerscourt in County Wicklow, and Baron Wingfield, of Wingfield in County Wexford, and he assumed his seat in the Irish House of Lords. In 1746 he was made a member of the Privy Council of Ireland.

Powerscourt was responsible for commissioning the German architect, Richard Cassels, to carry out extensive remodelling work on Powerscourt House between 1731 and 1741.

Personal life

On 30 August 1721 Anne Usher, a daughter of Christopher Usher, of Usher's Quay, Dublin. After her death, he married Dorothy Beresford Rowley (–1785) on 13 April 1727. His second wife was a daughter of Hercules Rowley, of Summer Hill, and the former Frances Upton (a younger daughter of Arthur Upton, of Castle Upton). Together they had four children, including: 

 Hon. Frances Wingfield (1728–1794), who married John Gore, 1st Baron Annaly, in 1747.
 Edward Wingfield, 2nd Viscount Powerscourt (1729–1764), an MP for Stockbridge who died unmarried in 1764.
 Richard Wingfield, 3rd Viscount Powerscourt (1730–1788), an MP for Wicklow County who married Lady Amelia Stratford, daughter of John Stratford, 1st Earl of Aldborough, in 1760.
 Hon. Isabella Wingfield (d. 1808), who married Sir Charles Style, 5th Baronet, in 1770.

Lord Powerscourt died on 21 October 1751. He was succeeded in his titles by his eldest son, Edward. Edward was in turn succeeded by the first Viscount's second son, Richard.

References

1697 births
1751 deaths
18th-century Anglo-Irish people
Irish MPs 1727–1760
Members of the Irish House of Lords
Members of the Privy Council of Ireland
Viscounts in the Peerage of Ireland
Peers of Ireland created by George II
Members of the Parliament of Ireland (pre-1801) for County Roscommon constituencies